John Bernard "Jack" O'Reilly Jr. (born September 21, 1948) is the former mayor of Dearborn, Michigan serving for 15 years.  A Democrat, he previously served for 17 years on the Dearborn City Council.

Career

Dearborn City Council

O'Reilly Jr. began his political career serving as a city councilmen for Dearborn for 17 years between 1990 and 2007.

Mayor of Dearborn

Following the passing of mayor Michael Guido from cancer O'Reilly was appointed the interim mayor until a special election could be held. He proceeded to run as a candidate during the special election and won and would be sworn in as a full mayor on February 27, 2007. As mayor he greatly improved the city's public infrastructure, including the construction of the John D. Dingell Train Station in an effort to turn the city into a regional transportation hub. As mayor he also greatly streamlined the bureaucratic process in the city, cutting out red tape. 

In January 2019, Dearborn Historian editor Bill McGraw had his contract terminated for an Autumn 2018 issue concerning Henry Ford. That issue, concurrent with the 100th anniversary of Ford's acquisition of the Dearborn Independent newspaper, detailed the anti-Semitic influence that Ford infamously exerted. The city government's suppression of the issue received widespread exposure, with some calling for Dearborn officials and others related to Ford's industry to recognize the impact of Ford's antisemitism. As a result of the national publicity, the Dearborn Historical Commission held an emergency meeting in which the commission created a resolution that called for the end of censorship of the issue. 
   
At a municipal deposition on February 13, 2019 mayor O'Reilly was unable to answer basic personal questions, forgetting how many children he had, their names and ages, as well as stating he took his Bar exam in 1890. However, despite this he continued to serve as mayor for an additional two years until in another deposition on June 26, 2021, where he was too mentally unfit to even appear, instead having to issue all his statements through curated press releases. He would announce on July 9, 2021 that has been suffering from an undisclosed illness preventing him from making public appearances and that he will not be seeking another term as mayor retiring after 32 years of public service.

Personal life

His family background includes an elected official.  His father, John B. O'Reilly Sr., was mayor from 1978 to 1985 and also Dearborn Police Chief. He is married and has three sons.

References

Mayors of places in Michigan
Michigan Democrats
Living people
1948 births